A Match and Some Gasoline is the fifth album by the Detroit, Michigan punk rock band The Suicide Machines, released in 2003 by Side One Dummy Records. It was the band's first album for the Side One Dummy label, after their departure from Hollywood Records the previous year. It was also their first album to include bassist Rich Tschirhart, replacing longtime member Royce Nunley who had left the group in 2002. The album's musical direction returned the band to the ska punk and hardcore styles of their first two albums, almost completely abandoning the pop punk style they had incorporated into their previous two releases. A music video was filmed for the single “Keep It A Crime”. The song “High Anxiety” appeared on the soundtrack of Tony Hawk’s Underground 2.

Track listing
Adapted from Apple Music.

Personnel

The Suicide Machines
Jason Navarro – Lead vocals
Dan Lukacinsky – Guitar, backing vocals
Rich Tschirhart – Bass, backing vocals
Ryan Vandeberghe – Drums

Additional musicians
Peter Knudson – additional percussion on "Split the Time" and "Kaleidoscope"

Production
Bill Stevenson – producer, engineer
Jason Livermore – Producer, engineer
The Suicide Machines– Producer
Brian Gardener - Mastered at Bernie Grundman Mastering in Hollywood, California

Artwork
Jime Litwalk - Album artwork 
Eric Leidlein and Jime Litwalk - Layout and design 
Rich Tschirhart - Black-and-white photography 
C.J. Benninger - Live photography

References

The Suicide Machines albums
SideOneDummy Records albums
2003 albums
Albums produced by Bill Stevenson (musician)